Gaisano Capital is a chain of malls and supermarkets owned by Edmund S. Gaisano Sr., the second son of Henry S. Gaisano Sr. In the 1970s, he had his own construction business independent of his relatives. One of his projects was to construct a building (which was to be named the Henry Gaisano Building after his father, one of Doña Modesta's sons) located along Leon Kilat and Colon streets in Cebu City which was to be leased as a supermarket by his relatives. When the supermarket venture failed, Edmund Gaisano Sr. decided to open his own supermarket. This supermarket became the first Gaisano Capital supermarket and is presently known as Gaisano Capital South.

As of the last quarter of 2015, Gaisano Capital has 31 stores, with the recent shopping mall opened December 2011 located in Surigao City. Others were in San Francisco, Agusan del Sur (also opened in November 2014), Tandag, Bislig, Butuan (opening soon but still under construction and later cancelled) and recently Balingasag (opened May 2019).

Branches

Cebu
 City Soho Mall - B.Rodriguez St., Guadalupe, Cebu City
 Gaisano Capital Casuntingan - M.L Quezon Ave., Casuntingan, Mandaue
 Gaisano Capital Danao - F. Ralota St., Danao
 Gaisano Capital South - Henry Gaisano Bldg. Colon Cor. Leon Kilat St., Cebu City
 Gaisano Capital SRP - Laray, San Roque, Talisay, Cebu
 Gaisano Capital Tisa - F. Llamas St., Tisa, Cebu City
 Gaisano Island Mall - Pajo, Lapu-Lapu City
 Gaisano Saversmart Bacayan - Bacayan, Cebu City
 Gaisano Saversmart T. Padilla - T. Padilla St., Cebu City
 Gaisano Saversmart Danao Central - Juan Luna St., Tuburan Sur, Danao
 Gaisano Saversmart Inayawan - F.Jaca St., Inayawan, Cebu City
 Gaisano Saversmart Mactan - Basak, Lapu-Lapu City
 One Pavillion Mall - No. 7 R. Duterte St., Cebu City

Iloilo
 Gaisano Capital Balasan - Mamhut Sur, Balasan
 Gaisano Capital Guanco - Guanco St., Iloilo City
 Gaisano Capital ICC - Benigno Aquino Ave., Mandurriao District, Iloilo City
 Gaisano Capital Oton - J.C Zulueta St., Oton
 Gaisano Capital Passi - Simeon Aguilar St., Passi, Iloilo
 Gaisano City Iloilo - Luna St., La Paz District, Iloilo City

Leyte
 Gaisano Capital Real - 78 Real St, Tacloban
 Gaisano Capital Tacloban - J. Romualdez St., Tacloban
 Gaisano Central Tacloban - J. Romualdez St., Tacloban
 Gaisano Riverside Mall - Alegria, Ormoc
 Gaisano Saversmart Ormoc - Rizal St., Brgy. 21, Ormoc Sigat

Other Visayan provinces
 Gaisano Capital Boracay - Manocmanoc, Boracay, Malay, Aklan
 Gaisano Capital Kalibo - Andagao, Kalibo, Aklan
 Gaisano Capital San Carlos - Ledesma St., San Carlos, Negros Occidental
 Gaisano Capital Sogod - Zone V, Sogod, Southern Leyte

Mindanao
 Gaisano Capital Balingasag - Linggangao, Nat'l Highway, Balingasag
 Gaisano Capital Bislig - Mangagoy, Bislig
 Gaisano Capital Davao - Sto. Niño, Tugbok District, Davao City
 Gaisano Capital Ozamiz - Rizal Ave., Ozamiz
 Gaisano Capital Pagadian - Rizal St., Pagadian
 Gaisano Capital San Francisco - Brgy. 4, Nat'l Highway, San Francisco, Agusan del Sur
 Gaisano Capital Surigao - Km. 4, Brgy. Luna, Surigao City
 Gaisano Capital Tandag - Cabrera St. cor. Navales St., Poblacion, Tandag

Luzon
 Gaisano Capital Binangonan - Manila East Road, Calumpang, Binangonan
 Gaisano Capital Calapan - Tawiran, Nat'l Road, Calapan
 Gaisano Capital Iriga - San Roque, Iriga
 Gaisano Capital Masbate - Quezon St., Crossing, Masbate City
 Gaisano Capital San Jose - Nat'l Road, Labangan, San Jose, Occidental Mindoro
 Gaisano Capital Sorsogon - Magsaysay St., Almendras Cogon, Sorsogon City

References

External links
 Official website

Companies based in Cebu City
Shopping malls in the Philippines
Real estate companies established in 1977
Retail companies established in 1977
Philippine brands